Youth Is Wasted on the Young is the first studio album by the Danish band Scarlet Pleasure. It was released on May 13, 2016, around two years after their debut EP Mirage. It consist of 13 tracks recorded over two years, among other their debut single "Windy".The songs "Sometimes", "Moments" and "Midnight Soldier" on the album is produced by Om'Mas Keith who has produced for Jay Z and John Legend, and among other Frank Oceans album Channel Orange. The song "Blow" is produced by Ronni Vindahl. The rest of the album is produced by David Mørup.

Track listing

Charts

References

2016 albums
Scarlet Pleasure albums